Komi-Permyak may refer to:
Komi-Permyak Okrug, a territory with special status within Perm Krai, Russia
Komi-Permyak language, a language spoken in Komi-Permyak Okrug, Russia